

In geomorphology, a butte is an isolated hill with steep, often vertical sides and a small, relatively flat top; buttes are smaller landforms than mesas, plateaus, and tablelands. The word butte comes from a French word meaning knoll (but of any size); its use is prevalent in the Western United States, including the southwest where mesa (Spanish for "table") is used for the larger landform. Due to their distinctive shapes, buttes are frequently landmarks in plains and mountainous areas. To differentiate the two landforms, geographers use the rule of thumb that a mesa has a top that is wider than its height, while a butte has a top that is narrower than its height.

Formation
Buttes form by weathering and erosion when hard caprock overlies a layer of less resistant rock that is eventually worn away. The harder rock on top of the butte resists erosion. The caprock provides protection for the less resistant rock below from wind abrasion which leaves it standing isolated. As the top is further eroded by abrasion and weathering, the excess material that falls off adds to the scree or talus slope around the base. On a much smaller scale, the same process forms hoodoos.

Notable buttes
The Mitten Buttes of Monument Valley in the Utah-Arizona state line are two of the most distinctive and widely recognized buttes. Monument Valley and the Mittens provided backgrounds in the scenes of many western-themed films, including seven movies directed by John Ford. The Devils Tower in northeastern Wyoming is a laccolithic butte composed of igneous rock rather than sandstone, limestone or other sedimentary rocks.

The term butte is sometimes applied more broadly to isolated, steep-sided hills with pointed or craggy, rather than flat, tops. Three  notable formations that are either named butte or may be considered buttes even though they do not conform to the formal geographer's rule are Scotts Bluff in Nebraska which is a collection of five bluffs, Crested Butte, which is a  mountain in Colorado, and Elephant Butte, which is now an island in Elephant Butte Reservoir in New Mexico.

Among the well-known non-flat-topped buttes in the United States are Bear Butte, South Dakota, Black Butte, Oregon, and the Sutter Buttes in California. In many cases, buttes have been given other names that do not use the word butte, for example, Courthouse Rock, Nebraska.  Also, some large hills that are technically not buttes have names using the word, examples of which are Kamiak Butte, Chelan Butte and Steptoe Butte in Washington state.

Gallery

See also

Footnotes

References

External links

 
 

 
Sandstone
Geomorphology
Geography terminology
Erosion landforms
Slope landforms
Tables (landform)